The 16th Annual D.I.C.E. Awards is the 16th edition of the D.I.C.E. Awards, an annual awards event that honors the best games in the video game industry. It was also held as part of the Academy's 2013 D.I.C.E. Summit, and was hosted by stand up comedian Chris Hardwick.

Journey received the most nominations and won the most awards, including Game of the Year. Sony Computer Entertainment published the most nominees and published the most award winners.

Gabe Newell, founder of  Valve Corporation and lead developer of the digital store front, Steam, received the of the Academy of Interactive Arts & Sciences Hall of Fame Award. Infocom co-founders Marc Blank and Dave Lebling both received the Pioneer Award.

Winners and Nominees
Winners are listed first, highlighted in boldface, and indicated with a double dagger.

Special Awards

Hall of Fame
 Gabe Newell

Pioneer
 Marc Blank
 Dave Lebling

Games with multiple nominations and awards

The following 16 games received multiple nominations:

The following three games received multiple awards:

Companies with multiple nominations

Companies that received multiple nominations as either a developer or a publisher.

Companies that received multiple awards as either a developer or a publisher.

External links

References

2013 awards
2013 awards in the United States
February 2013 events in the United States
2012 in video gaming
D.I.C.E. Award ceremonies